The Concept Prowler is an American ultralight trike that was designed and produced by Concept Aviation of Knoxville, Tennessee.

Design and development
It features a cable-braced hang glider-style high-wing, weight-shift controls, a single-seat, open cockpit, tricycle landing gear and a single engine in pusher configuration.

The Prowler's design goals included maximum cruise speed and to achieve this a wing of small area was selected.

The aircraft is made from bolted-together aluminum tubing, with its double-surface wing covered in Dacron sailcloth. Its  area wing is supported by a single tube-type kingpost and uses an "A" frame control bar. The standard engines supplied was the  Rotax 447 twin cylinder, two-stroke, air-cooled, single ignition aircraft engine. A cockpit fairing and wheel pants were factory options.

Specifications (Powler)

References

External links
Photo of a Prowler in flight

1990s United States ultralight aircraft
Homebuilt aircraft
Single-engined pusher aircraft
Ultralight trikes